Helianthus speciosus is a Mexican species of sunflower in the family Asteraceae, called the showy Mexican sunflower. It is native to  the state of Michoacán in western Mexico.

Helianthus speciosus has 3-lobed leaves and a large flowering head with red ray florets and yellow disc florets. The plant grows to a height of approximately 18 inches (1 1/2 feet or 45 cm).

References

speciosus
Flora of Michoacán
Plants described in 1834
Endemic flora of Mexico